Timanthes of Pella, son of Pantiades was one of the trierarchs on the Hydaspes fleet of Nearchus in 326 BC.

References
Who's Who in the Age of Alexander the Great by  Waldemar Heckel 

Generals of Alexander the Great
Trierarchs of Nearchus' fleet

4th-century BC people
Ancient Pellaeans
Year of birth unknown

Year of death unknown